Michael Mällinen (born March 4, 1958) is a racecar driver from the United States.

He won several championships racing in formula car and sports prototype series in IMSA, ALMS, Atlantic Championship, and  SCCA. Mällinen won several US National titles in Formula Atlantic and Sports prototype series.

Mällinen had 63 grand prix starts with 18 wins, 36 podiums, 10 poles, and 10 fastest laps during his career.

Mällinen began his racing career in the 1990s driving Formula Ford and sports racers built by Lola cars in SCCA, Conference and endurance series.

In 2004, he won the SCCA C Sports Racer championship in the northeast division. Mällinen began racing Formula Atlantic in 2005. In 2006, he was the runner up in the Southeast SCCA Formula Atlantic championship driving a Ralt RT41. In 2007, he finished third in Formula Atlantic and made his debut in IMSA Lites in the L2 class driving a Stohr sports prototype. In 2008, Mällinen raced in the IMSA Lites L1 class driving an Élan Motorsport Technologies DP02 sports prototype and won the 2008 Formula Atlantic championship driving a Swift Engineering TRD 014.a for Swan Racing in the southeast division. In 2009 Mällinen made his debut in the IMSA Atlantic Championship racing for Swan Racing and won the Championship (C2) with 4 wins and 3 pole positions. In 2010, Mällinen won the American Road Race of Champions, finished third in the SCCA Formula Atlantic national championship series and third in the SCCA National Championship Runoffs driving a Swift Engineering TRD 014.a for Swan Racing. In 2010, Mällinen won 7 races and 8 pole positions. In 2011, Mällinen won the 2011 US National Championship, SCCA National Championship Runoffs, Division Championship, June Sprints, and the Triple Crown. Mällinen was the recipient of the Sports Car Club of America's 2011 Super Sweep Award in recognition of winning the National Championship, National Championship Runoffs, Division Title and various other races in a single season. In 2012, Mällinen finished second in the SCCA National Championship Runoffs driving a Swift Engineering TRD 014.a for Swan Racing. In 2013, Mällinen finished third in the SCCA National Championship Runoffs driving a Swift Engineering Cosworth 016.a for Swan Racing.

Mällinen currently resides in Washington and California.

Racing record

SCCA National Championship Runoffs

American open–wheel racing results
(key)

Atlantic Championship

External links
 

1958 births
Living people
Atlantic Championship drivers
SCCA National Championship Runoffs winners